The Noongar are a group of Aboriginal Australian peoples.

Noongar may also refer to:
 Noongar (caste), a social group of India
 Noongar language, an Australian Aboriginal language
 Noongar, Western Australia, a town in Australia
 Noongar Radio 100.9, a community radio station of Australia

See also
 Nunga, a term of self-reference for many of the Aboriginal peoples of South Australia